The 2023 ADAC GT Masters will be the seventeenth season of the ADAC GT Masters, the grand tourer-style sports car racing series founded by the German automobile club ADAC.

Prior to the season, the ADAC had initially confirmed that the series was set to pivot to a new formula. Dubbed DTM Endurance, the championship would become a support series for the DTM and feature both GT3 and LMP3 machinery, merging with the Prototype Cup Germany. The series was also set to forbid the presence of FIA Platinum-ranked drivers. While these plans were scrapped following backlash from teams, the series would require teams to field an FIA Silver or Bronze-rated driver in each driver lineup.

Calendar

Entry list

References

External links

ADAC GT Masters seasons
ADAC GT Masters
ADAC GT Masters
ADAC GT Masters